Ferdinand Deppe (1794–1861) was a German naturalist, explorer and painter. He was born and died in Berlin.

Deppe travelled to Mexico in 1824. He collected natural history specimens for the Zoological Museum of Berlin University with Count von Sack and William Bullock. He also collected in California and Hawaii on his way home in 1830. Some of his American flies were described by Christian Rudolph Wilhelm Wiedemann in Aussereuropäische Zweiflügelige Insekten published in Hamm (1828–1830).

In the field of herpetology, he is commemorated in the specific epithets of Abronia deppii (Deppe's arboreal alligator lizard), Aspidoscelis deppii (blackbelly racerunner), Pituophis deppei (Mexican pine snake), and Tantilla deppei (Deppe's centipede snake). His name is also associated with Herichthys deppii (Nautla cichlid), Deppe's squirrel (Sciurus deppei )  and Oxalis deppei, the so-called "lucky four-leaf clover".

He was the younger brother of Wilhelm Deppe, an accountant with the Zoological Museum. In 1830 a printed pricelist was distributed listing specimens for sale with the title: Preis-Verzeichniss der Saugethiere, Vogel, Amphibien, Fische und Krebse, welche von den Herren Deppe und Schiede in Mexico gesammelt worden, und bei dem unterzeichneten BevollmLhtigten in Berlin gegen baare Zahlung in Preuss. Courant zu erhalten sind. The items had been collected by Ferdinand Deppe in Mexico and the binomial names would have been supplied by Hinrich Lichtenstein who was the director of the Zoological Museum. This list was signed by Wilhelm Deppe and is now considered as the original publication for 11 bird species. Although Ferdinand Deppe collected the specimens, under the rules of the International Code of Zoological Nomenclature, Wilhelm Deppe is considered as the authority.

Associated publications 
 "Travels in California in 1837"; (1953) Part of the series: Early California travels series, 15. Translated from a publication of 1847, Zeitschrift für Erdkunde, vol. 7, p. 383-90.

References

Further reading
Stresemann, Erwin (1954). "Ferdinand Deppe's travels in Mexico, 1824-1829". Condor 56 (2): 86–92.

1794 births
1861 deaths
Scientists from Berlin
German naturalists
German entomologists
German explorers
German ornithologists
Artists from Berlin